John S. Conway, an artist and sculptor, was born February 21, 1852, in Dayton, Ohio. His middle name is listed differently in different sources as Severinus, Severine and Severino. He received his artistic training at the Art Institute of Chicago, the Ecole Julien, and at the École des Beaux-Arts. Conway also lived in Milwaukee, Italy, and New Jersey.

While Conway was in Paris, Robert William Vonnoh, a fellow art student, painted his portrait.

While in Italy Conway married Agata Meloni. They had four children: George (1885–1967), Etheldreda (1887–1900), Mario (1889–1962), and Robert (1899–1972).

Conway most famous work is the Milwaukee Soldiers Monument. The bronze sculpture titled The Victorious Charge was completed in Rome and shipped to Milwaukee. It stands in the median island on Wisconsin Ave between 8th and 10th Sts.

Conway returned to the United States in 1902. In 1904, he completed "Oklahoma," another large sculpture, for the St. Louis Exposition. Some of his other works appear in museums, archives and special collections, or occasionally come up for auction. Conway died December 25, 1925, at the age of 73 in his home in Tenafly, New Jersey.

References

Biographical information can also be found in this newspaper article: "To Wisconsin's Soldier Sons", Evening Wisconsin, June 28, 1989, and "Who Was Who in American Art: Compiled from the Original Thirty-Four Volumes of American Art Annual—Who's Who in Art, Biographies of American Artists Active from 1898 to 1947" by Peter H. Falk (pub. Madison, Conn: Sound View Press, 1985).

1852 births
1925 deaths
Artists from Dayton, Ohio
Sculptors from New Jersey
American alumni of the École des Beaux-Arts
20th-century American sculptors
19th-century American sculptors
19th-century American male artists
American male sculptors
People from Tenafly, New Jersey
Sculptors from Ohio
20th-century American male artists